Admiral Hill may refer to:

Harry W. Hill (admiral) (1890–1971), U.S. Navy admiral
Henry Hill (Royal Navy officer) (1772–1849), British Royal Navy vice admiral
J. Richard Hill (1929–2017), British Royal Navy rear admiral
John Hill (Royal Navy officer) (c. 1774–1855), British Royal Navy rear admiral
Jon A. Hill (born 1963), U.S. Navy vice admiral
Virgil L. Hill Jr. (born 1938), U.S. Navy rear admiral

See also
Nicholas Hill-Norton (born 1939), British Royal Navy vice admiral